The NCAA Division II Men's Gymnastics Championships were the annual collegiate gymnastics championships for men organised by the National Collegiate Athletic Association for athletes competing at universities in Division II. The championship was founded in 1968, breaking away from the championship for Division I, but ceased after the 1984 championship when it was merged back into one single national championship again.

Athlete's individual performances in the various events earned points for their institution and the team with the most points received the NCAA team title. Individual championships were also awarded in certain events. The most successful teams, with three national titles each, were Southern Connecticut State and Wisconsin–Oshkosh. The final championship was won by East Stroudsburg in 1984 before the event was disbanded.

Results

See also

NCAA Division I Men's Gymnastics Championship
NCAA Division I Women's Gymnastics Championships
NCAA Division II Women's Gymnastics Championships
Pre-NCAA Gymnastics Champions
List of gymnastics terms

References

External links
NCAA men's gymnastics webpage

Gymnastics, Division II Men
Division II